Jesse James Dunn (1867-1926) was a judge on the Oklahoma Supreme Court.

Early life and education 
Dunn was born on October 2, 1867, at Channahon, Will County, Illinois to James McCann and Alta Fiorina (née Lewis) Dunn. In 1857, James McCann Dunn worked for a contractor delivering freight to the new Fort Leavenworth, Kansas, but in 1858, he returned to his parents' home and went into some unspecified business, until he enlisted in the Union Army, then was assigned to Company A, 97th Regiment Illinois Infantry, later transferred to Company D, 37th Regiment Illinois Infantry, and on detached service in the ambulance corps after October 16, 1864. He was honorably discharged August 15, 1865, at New Orleans, Louisiana.

When J. J. was only three years old, his parents took him to Noxubee County, Mississippi, where the three of them lived with J. M.'s parents for six years.   Then they moved to El Paso in Woodford County, Illinois, where they lived until 1885. They moved on to Garden City in Finney County, Kansas, where J. J. went to work in a store owned by his father, as well as working as a farmhand. 

He had begun reading law in 1889 in the Garden City, Kansas office of George Lynn Miller. In 1892, Jesse enrolled in the University of Kansas Law School, and graduated with a Bachelor of Laws Degree on June 7, 1893.

Life in Oklahoma 
Jesse James Dunn and his father James McCann Dunn came to Oklahoma Territory in time to participate in the 1893 Land Run, leaving the rest of the family at home in Garden City, Kansas.

On September 16, 1893, Jesse made the run and was successful in finding a site in the new community of Alva, Oklahoma Territory where he settled down and opened a law partnership with George Lynn Miller, who later married Jesse's eldest sister.

In 1894, Jesse Dunn became a candidate for the Populist Party to become the County Judge of Woods County in Oklahoma Territory. He came within three votes of winning the nomination. He gained sufficient public exposure to win both the party nomination and the general election in 1896. He was reelected in 1898. Dunn resigned the position in 1901, after completing his second term.  He returned to practice law in Alva, where he now formed a partnership with Francis Marion Cowgill. Meanwhile, the Populist Party continued to decline, so Dunn affiliated with the Democratic Party under William Jennings Bryan's leadership.

Dunn was elected President of the Oklahoma Territory Bar Association in 1903, (serving through 1903-4). He was also unanimously elected chairman of the Oklahoma Territory Democratic Committee. In this new position, he managed the party's strategy to win the next election for the Territory's single representative to the U. S. Congress. Although the Democrats did not win that election, it did not cost Dunn any credibility with party officials. He was made the manager for the campaign to elect delegates to the 1906 Oklahoma Constitutional Convention. The resulting delegation was composed of 99 Democrats,1 Independent and 12 Republicans. His skill and ability as a leader and organizer were confirmed.

Williams credits Judge Dunn with unifying the remaining Populists with the regular Democrats in and after the 1906 election. In 1909, the newly constituted Oklahoma Supreme Court adopted a rotation plan for choosing a chief justice. It was agreed that Justice Matthew John Kane and Judge Dunn were equally eligible, so the court decided that Kane should serve the first year of the 1909-11 term, and Dunn should serve the second. On the second Monday of January 1911, John B. Turner was elected as Chief Justice, replacing Dunn.

Move to California 
Dunn resigned his seat, effective September 1, 1913 and announced that he planned to move to Oakland, California, where he and Judge John Yule, an uncle of Mrs. Dunn, had formed a partnership to practice law. Their firm was known as Dunn, White and Aiken from March 1, 1914 until it was dissolved by the surviving partners on December 31, 1938.

Death 
Dunn died at Livermore Sanitarium in Oakland on July 28, 1926. Biographer Robert Williams did not identify the cause of death. He did report that the judge was survived by his widow, Saidee (née Matson), and three children: Claud, who was married but had no children, Constance (Mrs. J. M. Rutherford), who had two young sons, and Dorothea (Mrs. D. G. White), who had no children.

Legacy 
In 1935, The Administration Building of the Northwestern State Teachers' College at Alva, Oklahoma burned down. After it was replaced, the new building was named by the Oklahoma Legislature as "Jesse Dunn Hall."

Notes

References 

1867 births
1926 deaths
People from Garden City, Kansas
People from Noxubee County, Mississippi
People from Woodford County, Illinois
People from Alva, Oklahoma
People from Oakland, California
Justices of the Oklahoma Supreme Court
Emporia State University alumni
University of Kansas School of Law alumni
Oklahoma Democrats